STARLIMS Corporation (Starlims) is a subsidiary of Francisco Partners that provides web-based laboratory information management systems.

History
The company was founded by Itschak Friedman and Dinu Toiba in Israel in 1986, and developed and sold LIMS software. The company was renamed to Starlims.  By 2005, the company's software was installed at the US Centers for Disease Control and Prevention and in systems of state health authorities in 12 US states. The company held its IPO in the US in 2007.  Friedman served as CEO until the company was acquired by Abbott Laboratories in 2009 for $123 million; at that time the company had 160 employees and most of its operations and sales were in the US, the UK, and Hong Kong.  By the time of the sale, Starlims was offered as a web application. Abbott intended to fold Starlims' products offerings into its other health information technology businesses in an effort to improve its clinical diagnostics business.
In 2014, Abbott changed the subsidiary's name from Starlims to Abbott Informatics. In July 2021 Abbott sold Starlims to Francisco Partners.

References

External links 

Tableau Software  Provider of Starlims' Advanced Analytics data visualisation tool,  a rebranded version of Tableau Server.

Information systems
Laboratory information management system
Software companies based in Florida
Software companies of Israel
Companies based in Broward County, Florida
Hollywood, Florida
Software companies of the United States
1986 establishments in Israel
Software companies established in 1986
American companies established in 1986
2021 mergers and acquisitions